Blooming Prairie can refer to a location in the United States:

Blooming Prairie, Minnesota
Blooming Prairie High School
Blooming Prairie Township, Steele County, Minnesota